Mark Tinker (born January 16, 1951) is an American television producer and director. Tinker was an executive producer and regular director on the HBO series Deadwood. Prior to Deadwood, Tinker served as a director/producer on NYPD Blue, which was co-created by Deadwood writer David Milch. Tinker has also directed episodes of The White Shadow, St. Elsewhere, Capital News, Civil Wars, Chicago Hope, L.A. Law, Grey's Anatomy, Private Practice, Scandal, Chicago P.D., Magnum P.I., and American Gods.

Early life
Tinker was born in Stamford, Connecticut, the son of Ruth Prince (née Byerly) (1927–2004) and former NBC chairman Grant Tinker (1926–2016), and the brother of John Tinker, with whom he worked on St. Elsewhere. His stepmother was Mary Tyler Moore, who was married to Grant Tinker from 1962 until 1981.

Tinker graduated from Syracuse University in 1973.

Career
Tinker joined the crew of the HBO western drama Deadwood as an executive producer and director for the third and final season in 2006. The series was created by David Milch and focused on a growing town in the American West. Tinker directed the episodes "Tell Your God to Ready for Blood", "Unauthorized Cinnamon", "A Constant Throb" and "Tell Him Something Pretty".

Tinker last collaborated with David Milch on the short-lived HBO drama series John from Cincinnati, which began airing in June, 2007. Tinker directed the pilot and served as executive producer.

Personal life
Formerly married (1988–2000) to the actress and painter Kristin Harmon, he married actress Chandra West in October 2005.

Filmography
[[Magnum P.I. (2018 TV series)|Magnum P.I.]]
1.14 "Nowhere to Hide" (2019) TV Episode
For the People
episode 1.02 "Rahowa" (2018) TV Episode
Chicago Med
3.03 "Trust Your Gut" (2017) TV Episode
Chicago P.D.
1.04 "Trust is Always Temporary" (2014) TV Episode
1.07 "The Price We Pay" (2014) TV Episode
1.12 "8:30 PM" (2014) TV Episode
1.15 "A Beautiful Friendship" (2014) TV Episode
2.1 "Call It Macaroni" (2014) TV Episode
2.5 "An Honest Woman" (2014) TV Episode
2.14 "Erin's Mom" (2015) TV Episode
2.21 "There's My Girl" (2015) TV Episode
2.23 "Born Into Bad News" (2015) TV Episode
3.2 "Natural Born Storyteller" (2015) TV Episode
3.5 "Climbing Into Bed" (2015) TV Episode
3.11 "Knocked The Family Right Out" (2016) TV Episode
3.19 "If We Were Normal" (2016) TV Episode
3.23 "Street Digging" (2016) TV Episode
4.1 "The Silos" (2016) TV Episode
4.6 "Some Friend" (2016) TV Episode
4.11 "You Wish" (2017) TV Episode
4.14 "Seven Indictments" (2017) TV Episode
4.23 "Fork in the Road" (2017) TV Episode
5.8 "Politics" (2017) TV Episode
5.11 "Confidential" (2018) TV Episode
Scandal
episode 2.04 "Beltway Unbuckled" (2012) TV Episode
episode 2.14 "Whiskey Tango Foxtrot" (2013) TV Episode
episode 2.21 "Any Questions?" (2013) TV Episode
Private Practice
episode 1.01 "In Which We Meet Addison, a Nice Girl From Somewhere Else" (2007) TV Episode
episode 1.03 "In Which Addison Finds the Magic" (2007) TV Episode
episode 1.08 "In Which Cooper Finds a Port In His Storm" (2007) TV Episode
episode 2.01 "A Family Thing" (2008) TV Episode
episode 2.08 "Crime and Punishment" (2008) TV Episode
episode 2.12 "Homeward Bound" (2009) TV Episode
episode 2.16 "Ex-Life" (2009) TV Episode
episode 2.19 "What Women Want" (2009) TV Episode
episode 3.01 "A Death in the Family" (2009) TV Episode
episode 3.07 "The Hard Part" (2009) TV Episode
episode 3.10 "Blowups" (2009) TV Episode
episode 3.16 "Fear of Flying" (2010) TV Episode
John from Cincinnati
episode 1.01 "Pilot"
Deadwood
episode 3.01 "Tell Your God to Ready for Blood" (2006) TV Episode
episode 3.07 "Unauthorized Cinnamon" (2006) TV Episode
episode 3.10 "A Constant Throb" (2006) TV Episode
episode 3.12 "Tell Him Something Pretty" (2006) TV Episode
Grey's Anatomy (2005)
episode 2.27 "Losing My Religion" (2006) TV Episode
episode 2.05 "Bring the Pain" (2005) TV Episode
'NYPD Blue 
"Frickin' Fraker" (2003) TV Episode
"Danny Boy" (1998) TV Episode
"Top Gum" (1998) TV Episode
"Hammer Time" (1998) TV Episode
"A Box of Wendy" (1998) TV Episode
Philly (2001) TV Series
Brooklyn South (1997) TV Series
Bonanza: Under Attack (1995) (TV)
ER
"Going Home" (1994) TV Episode
Chicago Hope (1994) TV Series
L.A. Law
"Dead Issue" (1994) TV Episode
"God Is My Co-Counsel" (1994) TV Episode
"Foreign Co-respondent" (1993) TV Episode
"Book of Renovation, Chapter 1" (1993) TV Episode
Civil Wars (1991) TV Series (1991–1993)
Babe Ruth (1991) (TV)
N.Y.P.D. Mounted (1991)
Our Shining Moment (1991)
My Old School (1991) (TV)
Capital News (1990) (TV)
Private Eye (1987)
St. Elsewhere (1982) TV Series (1982–1988)
Making the Grade (1982) TV Series
The White Shadow (1978)
The Bob Newhart Show
"Carol Ankles for Indie-Prod" (1978)

References

External links

1951 births
American television directors
Television producers from New York (state)
Living people
Artists from Stamford, Connecticut
S.I. Newhouse School of Public Communications alumni
Television producers from Connecticut